Peter Burke (born 24 May 1964) is a former Australian rules footballer who represented the Fitzroy Football Club and the Richmond Football Club in the Victorian Football League (VFL) during the 1980s. Burke played in Fitzroy's 1982 Under 19's premiership side, one of the last premierships in any form won by the club before making his debut in 1984.
After two years with the Lions, and a season out of the game, Burke made the move to Richmond for the 1987 season, where he added two games to his league total before leaving the VFL.

References

1964 births
Living people
Fitzroy Football Club players
Richmond Football Club players
Australian rules footballers from Victoria (Australia)